Cold Comfort Farm is a 1995 British comedy film directed by John Schlesinger and produced by the BBC and Thames Television, an adaptation of Stella Gibbons' 1932 book of the same name, the film stars Kate Beckinsale, Joanna Lumley, Ian McKellen and Rufus Sewell. Originally broadcast on 1 January 1995 on the BBC, it was Schlesinger's final film shot in his home country of Britain, and was picked up for theatrical release in North America through Gramercy Pictures, where it was a small success.

Plot

After the death of her parents, young Flora Poste goes to stay with her friend, the eccentric divorcee Mrs. Mary Small. Flora initially aspires to be a writer, deciding that the only way for her to live whilst researching her writing is to stay with one of her many “dreadful” relatives. Mary suggests anything else, including beekeeping.

Due to her relative lack of means, her city-based relations show no interest.  Flora sends letters to her country relatives. While the smattering of responses are generally unsuitable, one is intriguing. Flora chooses to stay for a while with the Starkadder branch of the family on their rundown farm.

The Starkadders are an assortment of rustic, uncouth, truly eccentric and quite possibly mad characters, each with a secret or not-so-secret heart's desire. Flora’s desire is to find out what was the ancient wrong which was “done to” her father and why the resulting doom lay over the Starkadder farm.

She finds out that her cousin Judith, is morose and depressed while Judith’s husband, Amos, wants to be the leader of his own, somewhat “Pentecostal” religion, the Quivering Brethren. But believing himself responsible for the farm, and shunning vanity, he makes everyone else unhappy. Meanwhile the brothers Seth and Reuben fear Flora’s influence and believe she’s come to take the farm away from them.

Flora quickly realises that, as a sensible, modern woman, she has the ability to assess, coax and organise each person into solving their own problems.

Cast

Production
The film was edited at Rank Film Laboratories, part of The Rank Organisation. The film itself reached a length of 2,902 metres, and ultimately became 105 minutes long in movie format. The soundtrack was created through development of pre-existing pieces remixed for the film. The majority of the songs used in the film were arranged by Robert Lockhart. The soundtrack was recorded at Lansdowne Studios in London, and was rerecorded at Twickenham Film Studios.

Director John Schlesinger was the only one who thought it would work in North America cinemas and so had to put up the money himself to blow up the print from 16mm to 35mm; he took the new format to the Toronto Film Festival, where its success led to a North American release.

The production visited Kent where they filmed at Kent & East Sussex Railway which provided the trains for Flora's journey from London to her relatives at Cold Comfort Farm and Northiam station in East Sussex which is the fictional railway station of Beershorne.

Further scenes were filmed in Brightling in East Sussex, and Twickenham Studios in London.

The Royal Military Canal was also used for scenes where Flora and Elfine walk and chat.

Reception
In the opening weekend of the film's release in the United States, it grossed $4,139,000. During its theatrical release in North America, the film grossed $5,682,429 in total. 
Cold Comfort Farm received generally positive reviews. On Rotten Tomatoes it has an approval rating of 83% based on reviews from 40 critics. 

Emanuel Levy of Variety wrote: "The fun that Schlesinger and his first-rate ensemble must have had while working on this production is infectious, for there isn't one dull -- or quiet -- moment in the film."

References

External links
 
 Cold Comfort Farm at the British Film Institute
 

 New York Times review 

1995 films
1995 television films
1995 romantic comedy films
British romantic comedy films
British comedy television films
1990s English-language films
Films directed by John Schlesinger
Films about orphans
Films based on British novels
Films set in Sussex
Films set in the 1920s
Films shot in England
British independent films
Universal Pictures films
BBC Film films
Films set in country houses
Films set on farms
Gramercy Pictures films
1995 independent films
Films shot in 16 mm film
1990s British films